Al-Bilaliyah (also spelled ''Bilaliyeh) is a village in southern Syria, administratively part of the Rif Dimashq Governorate, located east of Damascus city. Situated in the fertile Ghouta region, nearby localities include Marj al-Sultan to the west, al-Nashabiyah to the north, al-Qasimiyah and al-Jarba to the northeast, al-Qisa to the east and Deir Salman to the south. According to the Syria Central Bureau of Statistics, al-Bilaliyah had a population of 2,914 in the 2004 census.

References

Populated places in Douma District